Langham is a village and civil parish in Rutland in the East Midlands of England.

The village's name means 'homestead/village which is long or hemmed-in land which is long'.

It has two pubs, the Wheatsheaf and the Noel Arms, and a Church of England primary school. Langham Lodge is a Grade II listed house on the edge of the village.

The Church of England parish church of Saints Peter and Paul dates in part from the late 13th century and is a Grade I listed building. There is also a Baptist Chapel, built in 1854.

Notable inhabitants include Simon Langham, a 14th-century monk who became Archbishop of Canterbury; Major General John Brocklehurst, 1st Baron Ranksborough CB CVO (13 May 1852 – 28 February 1921), a soldier, courtier and Liberal politician - there is a memorial to the latter in the village church; and Alicia Kearns, the current MP for Rutland and Melton.

Ruddles Brewery was based in Langham from its foundation in 1858 until it was closed in 1997. The water from the local well was said to give the beer a unique character and quality, which enhanced the brewery's reputation. The site of the brewery has now been demolished and replaced by a housing development.

References

Further reading

External links

 Langham Village History Group
 Rutnet
 Langham History at Rutnet

Villages in Rutland
Civil parishes in Rutland